Bijoy Kumar Banerjee (1927–1996) was an Indian politician. He was the 6th Speaker of the West Bengal Legislative Assembly from 8 March 1967 to 2 May 1971.

References 

1927 births
1996 deaths
Bengali politicians
Speakers of the West Bengal Legislative Assembly
West Bengal MLAs 1967–1969
West Bengal MLAs 1969–1971